The 1984–85 Northern Counties East Football League season was the third in the history of Northern Counties East Football League, a football competition in England.

At the end of the season divisions One North, One Central and One South was reorganised. The clubs were distributed between newly formed divisions One, Two and Three.

Premier Division

The Premier Division featured 17 clubs which competed in the previous season, along with two new clubs:
Denaby United, promoted from Division One South
Pontefract Collieries, promoted from Division One North

League table

Division One North

Division One North featured nine clubs which competed in the previous season, along with eight new clubs, promoted from Division Two North:
Collingham
Hall Road Rangers
Harrogate Railway Athletic
Phoenix Park
Pickering Town
Selby Town
Tadcaster Albion
Yorkshire Amateur

League table

Division One Central

Division One Central featured six clubs which competed in the previous season in Division One North or South, along with ten new clubs.
Clubs transferred from Division One North:
Hatfield Main
Ossett Albion
Ossett Town

Clubs transferred from Division One South:
Maltby Miners Welfare
BSC Parkgate
Woolley Miners Welfare

Clubs promoted from Division Two North:
Armthorpe Welfare
Fryston Colliery Welfare
Grimethorpe Miners Welfare
Pilkington Recreation
Thorne Colliery

Clubs promoted from Division Two South:
Brigg Town
Stocksbridge Works
Wombwell Sporting Association
Worsbrough Bridge Miners Welfare
Yorkshire Main

League table

Division One South

Division One South featured ten clubs which competed in the previous season, along with six new clubs, promoted from Division Two South:
Blidworth Welfare
Graham Street Prims
Kimberley Town
Kiveton Park
Oakham United
Retford Town

In addition, Norton Woodseats changed their name to Dronfield United.

League table

References

1984–85
8